Brilliant cresyl blue is a supravital stain used for counting reticulocytes.  It is classified as an oxazine dye. N95 dust masks, eye shields, and gloves must all be worn when handling the chemical.

References

Chlorides
Zinc compounds
Oxazine dyes
Phenoxazines